The 2007–08 Spartan South Midlands Football League season is the 11th in the history of Spartan South Midlands Football League a football competition in England.

Premier Division

The Premier Division featured 18 clubs which competed in the division last season, along with four new clubs:

Beaconsfiled SYCOB, relegated from the Southern Football League
Brimsdown Rovers, promoted from Division One
Cockfosters, promoted from Division One
Hanwell Town, relegated from the Southern Football League

League table

Division One

Division One featured 14 clubs which competed in the division last season, along with five new clubs:

Bedford Town Reserves
Cheshunt Reserves
Haringey Borough, relegated from the Premier Division
Royston Town, relegated from the Premier Division
Sport London e Benfica, joined from the Middlesex County Football League

Also, Bedford Valerio United changed name to Bedford.

League table

Division Two

Division Two featured 15 clubs, all competed in the division last season.

League table

References

External links
 Spartan South Midlands Football League

2007–08
9